A Split-Second is a Belgian new beat and electronic body music (EBM) band established in 1985. The band is seen as one of the pioneers of EBM and their music influenced the creation of the new beat genre.

History 

The project was born in 1985 as a solo project of Marc Heyndrickx (under the name Marc Ickx), who self-released the demo-tape "Stained Impressions" with Peter Bonne (later re-named Chrismar Chayell) producing. Bonne at that time was releasing music as Twilight Ritual together with vocalist Geert Coppens. To record the demo, Heyndrickx spent the last of his money on an amp and cassette deck and spent the holidays in the offices of Independent Films. Having heard the initial material, Bonne invited Heyndrickx to record more songs in his 4-track studio.

Antler records signed the band immediately upon hearing the first demo. After signing to Antler Records, A Split-Second made their debut in 1986 with the single "Flesh". It was followed the next year by the album Ballistic Statues. At that time the band was composed by Ickx and electronic musician Philip Vargod (better known for his new-beat/acid-house project Lips Kiss. Bonne of course was present as producer and co-author of 4 songs (including hit single "Flesh").

After a brief tour Philip V. left the band, replaced by Bonne who became an official member and a driving force behind A Split Second. With this new line-up the band released another single, "Rigor Mortis", in 1987.

In late 1988, they were signed to the American label, Wax Trax! Records, and released the albums A Split-Second and From The Inside in the US, the latter featuring the track "Colosseum Crash" . The single "Mambo Witch" peaked at #29 in 1989 on the Billboard US dance club charts in 1989. That year the band embarked on their first US tour with 24 dates and live support by Fedjean Venvelt (guitars) and Peter Bonne (keyboards).

Their 1990 album, Kiss of Fury, featured the track "The Parallax View", which peaked at #19 on the Billboard US dance club charts in 1991. Kiss of Fury saw the band moving towards more of a guitar-based sound, something that Ickx attributed to some of the material originally having been intended for his own solo album. For this release, the band continued with Antler-Subway in Europe, but left Wax Trax! for Caroline Records in the US. The band embarked on a second, 24 date US tour in 1990, joined by Nico Mansy on keyboards). Meanwhile, "Flesh" peaked in the UK Singles Chart at #68 in December 1991.

In 1991, Bonne became involved in a side project, Wasteland, which soon became more important for him than A Split-Second. Notwistanding this, he released, under the name A-Split Second, the remix album "Flesh & Fire - 1991 Remixes" without the presence of Icks (the real founding member of the band).

In late 1993 the Icks & Chayell released one more album Vengeance C.O.D. and, after a Swedish Tour in early 1994 the duo split. Ickx decided to continue alone under the name A-Split Second and joined Gitane Demone in her electronic project Demonix.

In March 1995 A Split Second/Marc Icks released the album "Megabite" and the tour saw Icks performing live with guitarist Fedzjean Venvelt and old keyboard-player Philip Vargod.
After this tour and new Demonix remixes (released only in 2000), Icks announces his retirement from the music scenes in 1997.

The band returned to the live scene in 2001. In 2012, the band headlined the Belgian Bodybeats festival and re-released their first demo on vinyl.

Influence and legacy 
A Split-Second's debut single "Flesh" is credited with starting the new beat genre. Although there is some variance in recalling who did what and why, the idea is that DJs began the style by spinning EBM records at a slower tempo to create a new sound. One such perspective: "Fat Ronnie's inspiration snowballed when Marc Grouls and a handful of other DJs were listening to "Flesh", the latest 12" from Belgian electronic band A Split Second in Antwerp's USA Import record store. By slowing the pitch control down to a lurching 33 (33+8), Marc transformed the track from pleasant Euro-Industrialism to the melodramatic, pomp-laden epic that's been firing London warehouses all summer."

In 2002, Perfecto Records released a progressive trance remix of "Flesh", produced by Paul Oakenfold.

Touring members
 Peter Meyvaert (guitar, 1987–89)
 Swan (guitar, 1987–89)
 Fedzjean Venvelt (guitar, 1989–90 / 1994–96)
 Nicolas Mansy (keyboards, 1990–91)

Discography

Albums
 Stained Impressions (1985)
 Ballistic Statues (1987)
 ... from the Inside (1988)
 Kiss of Fury (1990)
 Flesh and Fire – 1991 Remixes (1991)
 Introversion (Lay Back and Join) (1991)
 Vengeance C.O.D. (1993)
 Megabite (1995)
 Transmix (2001)

Singles
 "Flesh" (1986)
 "Rigor Mortis" (1987)
 "Smell of Buddha" (1987)
 "Mambo Witch" (1988)
 "Scandinavian Bellydance" (1988)
 "The Colosseum Crash" (1989)
 "Another Violent Breed" – The Live Versions (1989)
 "Firewalker" (1990)
 "Backlash" (1990)
 "The Parallax View" (1991)

References

External links
Discography
Profile at the Micrart Group 
Profile at Swerquin
Profile at LastFM

Belgian new beat music groups
Belgian techno music groups
Belgian industrial music groups
Electronic body music groups
Musical groups established in 1986
Musical groups disestablished in 1991
1986 establishments in Belgium
Wax Trax! Records artists